WSN Environmental Solutions was a major waste disposal company in New South Wales, Australia owned by the New South Wales Government. SITA Australia acquired WSN in February 2011 for $235AU million. The acquisition of WSN now makes SITA Australia's largest most advanced waste management network". WSN has a history of leading in the deployment of advanced waste treatment technologies, specifically mechanical biological treatment systems. WSN constructed the first UR-3R facility and has recently won a contract to develop Australia's first integrated waste management park at the Jacks Gully landfill, near Sydney.

WSN owns and operates 10 waste recycling, processing and disposal facilities.

See also

Jack's Gully landfill
Mechanical biological treatment

References
SITA Media Release regarding WSN acquisition

Government agencies of New South Wales
Waste management companies of Australia